The Frey Block is an historic structure located at 345 Market Street in the Gaslamp Quarter, San Diego, in the U.S. state of California. It was built in 1911.

See also

 List of Gaslamp Quarter historic buildings

References

External links
 

1911 establishments in California
Buildings and structures completed in 1911
Buildings and structures in San Diego
Gaslamp Quarter, San Diego